Mad Max is a German hard rock band from Münster. In 1988, the band consisted of Michael Voss (vocals), Jürgen Breforth (guitars), Roland Bergmann and Axel Kruse (drums). Mad Max's self-titled release was in 1982. They faded away in 1989. Voss and Breforth reunited and put out a comeback album in 1999. At the beginning of 2015, bassist Roland Bergmann left Mad Max, leaving Breforth as the only original member of the band.

The band announced in January 2021 via their official site that Voss had left the band to focus on other projects. In September, they announced their new vocalist, Julian Rolinger, with whom they recorded the album Wings of Time (2022).

Discography 
 Mad Max (1982), Roadrunner
 Rollin' Thunder (1984), Roadrunner
 Stormchild (1985), Roadrunner
 Night of Passion (1987), Roadrunner
 Never Say Never (1999), AOR Heaven
 Night of White Rock (2006), AOR Heaven
 In White EP (2006), AOR Heaven
 White Sands (2007), AOR Heaven
 Here We Are (2008), A-minor
 Welcome America (2010), A-minor
 Another Night of Passion (2012), Steamhammer
 Interceptor (2013), Steamhammer
 35 (2018), Steamhammer
Stormchild Rising (2020), Steamhammer
Wings of Time (2022), Rock of Angels

Members 

Current members
 Jürgen Breforth – rhythm guitars, backing vocals (1981–1989, 1999–present)
 Axel Kruse – drums (1984–1989, 2005–2007, 2011–present)
 Dethy Borchardt – guitars ( 2022–present)
 Fabian Ranft – bass, backing vocals (2020–present)
 Julian Rolinger – lead vocals (2021–present)

Former members
 Thomas Hoffmann – bass (1981–1982)
 Uwe Starck – drums (1981–1984)
 Wilfried Schneider – guitar (1981–1984)
 Andreas Baesler – lead vocals (1981–1983)
 Jürgen Sander – bass (1982–1984)
 Michael Voss – lead vocals (1983–1987, 1999–2020), lead guitar (1985–1987, 1999–2020)
 Roland Bergmann – bass, backing vocals (1984–1989, 2005–2015)
 Christopher Wegmann – guitars (1984–1989)
 Keith Ellis – lead vocals (1987–1989; died 2016)
 Carsten Tischer – bass (1999)
 Yogi Spittka – drums (1999)
 Hans in 't Zandt – drums (2008–2011)
 Jos Zoomer – drums (2008)
 Thomas "Hutch" Bauer – bass (2015–2020)
 Emre "Emmo" Acar – lead vocals (2020–2021)

References

External links 

 
 
 

German Christian metal musical groups
German heavy metal musical groups
Musical groups established in 1982
German hard rock musical groups
1982 establishments in Germany